Arisaema thunbergii, commonly known as Asian jack-in-the-pulpit, is a plant species in the family Araceae. It is found in Japan at elevations of 20–100 meters. The plant is poisonous as all parts contain calcium oxalate.

References

thunbergii
Flora of Japan
Plants described in 1835